The 1938 Akron Zippers football team was an American football team that represented the University of Akron as an independent during the 1938 college football season. In its third and final season under head coach Jim Aiken, the team compiled a 6–3 record and outscored opponents by a total of 117 to 94. Walter Kominic was the team captain.

Schedule

References

Akron
Akron Zips football seasons
Akron Zippers football